Kvalheim is a surname. Notable people with the surname include:

Arne Kvalheim (born 1945), Norwegian long-distance runner
Bård Kvalheim (born 1973), Norwegian middle-distance runner
Geir Ove Kvalheim (born 1970), Norwegian producer, film director, actor, and writer
Jan Kvalheim (born 1963), Norwegian beach volleyball player
Jan Otto Kvalheim, Norwegian handball player
Knut Kvalheim (born 1950), Norwegian long-distance runner
Tore Eugen Kvalheim (born 1959), Norwegian trade unionist